Avenida España, or España Avenue may refer to:

Avenida España (Trujillo), Peru
Avenida España (Valparaíso), coastal road from Valparaíso to neighboring Viña del Mar, Chile
Avenida España (es), in Asunción, Paraguay
Avenida España, Lima, Peru
Avenida de España (es), Albacete, Spain
Avenida Calle 100 (also called Avenida España Usaquén), Calle 100 (TransMilenio) Bogotá, Colombia
Avenida España, Cuenca, Azuay, Ecuador; track of the 2001 Pan American Race Walking Cup

See also
Bulevar España, Montevideo 
España Boulevard 8-lane major thoroughfare in Metro Manila